The School of the Nations, "Escola das Nações", is a bilingual (English- Portuguese) internationalist Baháʼí school in Lago Sul, in the Federal District, Brazil for students from all nations and backgrounds, whose core values are based on the moral and ethical principles of the Baháʼí Faith. Its aim is for students to develop the qualities and understanding to become "world citizens".

History
The school was founded in 1980 by two North American families of educators who envisioned building a school around a new model of international education.  The basis of this model was the Baháʼí teaching of "unity in diversity"; to create an environment in which students from different races, nationalities, cultures and religions could learn to live in peace and harmony, while developing their intellectual, physical and spiritual potentials to the highest degree.

During the 1990 International Literacy Year the school cooperated with several communities on projects, one of which included sponsorship by the Secretary of Education of the Federal District.

During a special session of the Brazilian Federal Chamber of Deputies honoring the 1996 visit of Madame Mary Rabbání, a Deputy of the Social Democratic Party (Brazil) noted the school as an example of the contributions of the Baháʼí faith in "the economic and educational fields".

Facility
In 2007 the school had 610 students enrolled on the two campuses: one for the Early Childhood program for students from ages 3 to 6 and the other for Elementary, Middle and High School. The school community is made up of Brazilian families, many of whom are part of diplomatic corps, as well as international families, (representing approximately 40 different countries), who are connected with various embassies, multi-national companies or non-governmental organizations such as UNICEF, the World Bank and the United Nations. There are 90 teachers on the staff including assistants.

Awards
 For the 2005-6 school year, the school is noted by "Artsonia" for several awards -  Leadership, Art Publishing, Fan Clubs, Comments, and Fund Raising Award (Ranked #1 in all categories).

References

External links

Official webpage

Bahá'í educational institutions
International schools in Brazil
Educational institutions established in 1980
Schools in Brazil
1980 establishments in Brazil